Sir Anthony St John (c.1585-by 1651) was an English Member of Parliament (MP) who sat in the House of Commons in 1624 and 1625. He supported the Parliamentary side in the English Civil War.

St John was a son of Oliver St John, 3rd Baron St John of Bletso and his wife Dorothy Reid, daughter of Sir John Rede or Reid, of Oddington, Gloucestershire. He was admitted fellow commoner at Queens' College, Cambridge on 9 November 1601. He was knighted on 5 August 1608 at Bletsoe together with his brother Alexander, also a future MP. Apart from Alexander, four other brothers, Oliver, Rowland, Henry and Beauchamp were to become MPs.

In 1624 St John was elected Member of Parliament for Wigan and in 1625 MP for Cheshire. He was returned again for Wigan in 1626 and 1628. St John was a captain in the Earl of Essex Regiment of Foot in 1642 and continued to support the parliamentary side during the Civil War.

St John lived at the ancient home of the St John family at Fonmon Castle, Glamorgan. The house was sold in 1656 to Colonel Philip Jones.

St John married on 24 April 1610 at St. Andrew Holborn, London, England Lady Katherine Herbert, the widow of Sir W. Herbert and a daughter of Morgan Aubrey, Salter of London, and by her had a son Oliver (who died at the age of 8) and Dorothy, who married Sir John Booth.

His eldest brother Oliver inherited the Barony and became Earl of Bolingbroke.

References

  

Year of death missing
Roundheads
Place of birth missing
Anthony
Alumni of Queens' College, Cambridge
English MPs 1624–1625
English MPs 1625
English MPs 1626
English MPs 1628–1629
Knights Bachelor
Younger sons of barons
Year of birth uncertain